Elizabeth S. Crowley (born November 27, 1977) is an American politician. She was previously the New York City Council member for the 30th district from 2009 to 2017, representing the neighborhoods of Glendale, Maspeth, Middle Village, Ridgewood, and parts of Woodside and Woodhaven, in the borough of Queens. Crowley is both the first woman and first Democrat to hold the seat. Crowley was a 2021 candidate for Queens Borough President. She is a cousin of former U.S. Congressman Joseph Crowley.

Early life and education

Crowley was born in Queens to a large and civically-active family. The 14th of 15 siblings, She joined multiple members of her extended family who had held elected office over the years.  Her father, Walter, was a local Democratic District Leader and City Council Member during the 1980s. Crowley's mother, Mary, served on the local School Board 24 for a number of years. Following Walter's death in office in 1985, Mary was tapped to finish out the remainder of his term. This made Crowley the third member of her immediate family to serve in the City Council.
Crowley is the cousin of former U.S. Congressman Joseph Crowley, vice chair of the House Democratic Caucus and Democratic Party chair in Queens County.

Crowley has a B.A. magna cum laude in restoration and preservation from SUNY Fashion Institute of Technology, where she was a Presidential Scholar, and an M.S. in city and regional planning from Pratt Institute's Graduate School of Architecture. She did historic preservation work on various landmarks through New York City, including Radio City Music Hall, Empire Theatre, and St. Patrick's Cathedral. She is a member of District Council 9 International Union of Painters and Allied Trades. Crowley also briefly worked as an educator.

Career

City Council elections
On March 17, 2008, Republican City Council Member Dennis P. Gallagher resigned from office after pleading guilty to two misdemeanor counts of sexual abuse stemming from a 2007 incident in which an intoxicated Gallagher forced himself upon an unidentified 52-year-old woman inside his Middle Village District Office. Mayor Michael Bloomberg subsequently called a special election for the following June 3 to fill Gallagher's vacant seat. On May 8, Crowley announced her candidacy, joining a crowded field that included Gallagher's predecessor Tom Ognibene, a Republican who held the seat until term-limited from office in 2001, city Elections Board Commissioner Anthony Como, civic leader Charles Ober, and attorney Joseph Suraci. Crowley and Como received the backing of the county Democratic and Republican parties, respectively, with Ober picking up the Independence Party line. Como eked out a victory over Crowley with a margin of just 41 votes.

Four months after Como's close victory, Como faced Crowley in the 2008 general election. Crowley anticipated to benefit from a higher turnout due to the historic candidacy of Barack Obama in a district where Registered Democrats outnumber Republicans 2-to-1. On election day, Crowley defeated Como by 4,369 votes.

For the third time in 17 months, Crowley ran for the 30th District during the 2009 citywide elections. This time, Crowley faced Ognibene, who had sat out the second 2008 race after the county Republicans passed him over by endorsing Como, despite his stated interest in running. The race quickly turned heated, with Ognibene criticizing Crowley's brief tenure in the Council as "ineffective," while the Democrat in turn painted her 65-year-old challenger as "out of touch." In the end, Crowley proved the stronger candidate, out-fundraising Ognibene and easily beating him in the November election.

In the 2017 New York City Council election, Robert Holden defeated Crowley by 137 votes. Holden, a Democrat, had previously lost to Crowley in the primary, but several other parties offered Holden their ballot line in the general and Holden ran as a Republican, Conservative, Reform and "Dump de Blasio" candidate.

Legislative work
In 2010, when the city faced serious budget cuts and Bloomberg Administration planned to close as many as 20 firehouses, Crowley, as Chair of the Council Committee on Fire & Criminal Justice, led a coalition of elected officials and community members to stop the planned closures. Crowley has taken both the Bloomberg and de Blasio administrations to task to improve the reliability of the city's 911 system.

Crowley led a fight to preserve and expand City health services for women. Crowley has also sponsored legislation to expand access to HPV vaccinations, birth control and other women's health services. Crowley has pushed the FDNY to double the number of women serving as firefighters in her efforts to improve gender equality among the city's emergency services. In an effort to bring more women to leadership roles in corporations, Crowley sponsored legislation requiring companies receiving city contracts to report the gender and racial makeup of their board members and executives.

Owing to her background in historic preservation, Crowley has worked to protect important local landmarks. In 2013, Crowley joined advocates in successfully lobbying the city's New York City Landmarks Preservation Commission (LPC) to confer landmark status on the century-old Forest Park Carousel, one of the last works of master carver Daniel Carl Muller, culminated a 40-year battle by the Woodhaven community to secure official landmark status for the beloved carousel.  That same year, Crowley oversaw the reopening of a nature preserve at the former Ridgewood Reservoir, a decommissioned 19th Century reservoir located in Highland Park on the Brooklyn–Queens border. This represented the culmination of a years-long effort by Crowley to maintain the site's natural character. The city Parks Department under Mayor Bloomberg had previously announced a number of proposals that would have limited public access to the site and installed sports facilities and comfort stations in two of the reservoir's three basins. However, in response to strong local opposition and a petition garnering over 1,000 signatures, Crowley joined with fellow elected officials in writing to New York Governor Andrew Cuomo to oppose the city's plan. Crowley subsequently secured Council funding towards a $7 million renovation that preserved the site as a nature area, while installing new fencing and lighting, and repaving walkways.
In November 2016, Crowley presided over a ceremony to official inaugurate the Central Ridgewood Historic District, a 40-block area including nearly 1,000 historic homes and buildings. At the time of its designation, Central Ridgewood is the largest historic district in the borough of Queens, and the third largest in the city after Manhattan's Greenwich Village and Brooklyn's Sunset Park.

Starting in 2015, Crowley joined preservationists and local residents in mounting a campaign to landmark historic Neir's Tavern in Woodhaven. Considered to be the oldest bar in the city, it has been a neighborhood watering hole for more than 180 years and was prominently featured in the Martin Scorsese film Goodfellas.
In May 2016, Crowley attended a rally at the Tavern with more than 100 local residents to call on the LPC to recognize the building. Crowley criticized the body for falling to prioritize the landmarking of historic sites in the borough. The proposal was rejected by the LPC, according to the bar's owner, because "Neir's Tavern does not rise to the level of significance to warrant landmark status" and that landmark status would not protect the site from future development.

In August 2016, city officials announced plans to house 110 homeless adult families at a Holiday Inn Express in Maspeth. Crowley declared her opposition to the planned shelter, noting the impact on the community of two existing homeless shelters along Queens Boulevard and pledging to "[work] with community leaders and residents" to halt the Maspeth proposal. The following week, New York City Department of Homeless Services Commissioner Steve Banks held a public meeting to present the plan to the community, drawing more than 1,000 residents opposed to the plan. Crowley also addressed the crowd, reiterating her opposition to the plan.

Election history

Personal life
Crowley was married to Dennis O'Hara, a New York City police officer. They have two sons, Dennis and Owen. She lives in Glendale, Queens with her sons.

References

External links
Campaign website
New York City Council: District 30 - Elizabeth Crowley
 Twitter page

1977 births
Candidates in the 2012 United States elections
Candidates in the 2021 United States elections
21st-century American politicians
Fashion Institute of Technology alumni
Living people
New York City Council members
New York (state) Democrats
Politicians from Queens, New York
Pratt Institute alumni
Women New York City Council members
21st-century American women politicians